"Living by Numbers" is a song by the English synthpop group New Musik. It was the band's biggest hit worldwide, peaking at No. 13 in January 1980 in the UK and No. 12 in Ireland. The song appeared on the band's debut album, From A to B. It was used, with reworked lyrics, for a Casio advert. The B-side of the single was "Sad Films".

Chart history

References

1979 songs
1980 singles
British new wave songs
GTO Records singles